Jerald Brown (born December 3, 1980) is a Canadian football defensive back who is currently a free agent. He played college football at Glenville State College.  Brown has played for the New York Dragons, Arizona Rattlers, Columbus Destroyers, and Kansas City Brigade of the Arena Football League, as well as the Montreal Alouettes and Toronto Argonauts of the CFL.

Professional career
Before playing in the CFL, Brown was a five-year veteran of the Arena Football League, where he played for the New York Dragons, Arizona Rattlers, Columbus Destroyers, and Kansas City Brigade. In the 2006 Arena Football League season, he was named the AFL Defensive Player of the Year when he led the league with 11 interceptions and 133 interception-return yards. In 2009, he signed with the Montreal Alouettes of the Canadian Football League and was a member of both the 97th Grey Cup and 98th Grey Cup championship team with the Montreal Alouettes. In 6 seasons in the CFL, he has recorded 271 tackles, 17 interceptions and 7 fumbles recovery.

On February 26, 2016, Brown signed with the Toronto Argonauts of the Canadian Football League. On May 31, 2016, Brown announced his retirement, but on August 7, 2016, Brown re-signed with the Argonauts as a free agent.

References

External links
 Toronto Argonauts bio
 Montreal Alouettes bio 
 AFL bio

1980 births
Living people
African-American players of Canadian football
American football cornerbacks
American football safeties
American football wide receivers
American players of Canadian football
Arizona Rattlers players
Canadian football defensive backs
Columbus Destroyers players
Glenville State Pioneers football players
Kansas City Brigade players
Montreal Alouettes players
New York Dragons players
Players of American football from Washington, D.C.
Toronto Argonauts players
21st-century African-American sportspeople
20th-century African-American people